"Just Three Words" is a song by British-Norwegian A1, released as the first single from the band's fifth studio album, Rediscovered on 8 April 2012. The track is a duet with singer-songwriter Annie Khalid. Although not released to promote the album, and only being available through the iTunes Store as a promotional single, the track was successful across Norway and became the most added track on Norwegian radio on the week beginning 11 April 2012. No music video was released for the single.

Track listing
 Digital download
 "Just Three Words" - 3:19

References

2012 singles
A1 (band) songs
Songs written by Mark Read (singer)
Songs written by Ben Adams
Songs written by Christian Ingebrigtsen
2012 songs